Electric Peak is the tallest mountain in the Gallatin Range of southern Montana, close to the Wyoming border and rises to an altitude of .

Electric Peak was named during the first ascent in 1872 by the United States Geological Survey. Members of the Hayden Survey led by Henry Gannett experienced electrical discharges from their hands and hair after a lightning event on the summit.

Gallery

See also
Mountains and mountain ranges of Yellowstone National Park

Notes

External links 
 Electric Peak Webcam (Struck by lightning and retired in 2016)

Mountains of Montana
Mountains of Park County, Montana
Mountains of Yellowstone National Park
Articles containing video clips